Albert "Al" Robinson (June 18, 1947 – January 24, 1974) was a boxer from Oakland, California who competed in the featherweight division (– 57 kg) during his career.

Amateur career
Robinson was the featherweight (125 pounds) silver medalist in the 1968 Olympic Games in Mexico City.  In the final Robinson lost a highly disputed bout to Antonio Roldan of Mexico.  Robinson was dominating the fight when suddenly the referee gave Robinson a warning.  About a minute later, the referee issued a second violation for an alleged butt that opened up a bloody gash on Roldan's head. This resulted in Robinson's automatic disqualification.

1968 Olympic results
Below are the results of Al Robinson, a featherweight boxer who represented the United States at the 1968 Mexico City Olympics:

 Round of 32: defeated John Cheshire (Great Britain) referee stopped contest
 Round of 16: defeated Teogenes Pelegrino (Philippines) by knockout in second round
 Quarterfinal: defeated Adbel Khaliaf (Egypt) on points, 5-0
 Semifinal: defeated Ivan Mihailov (Bulgaria) on points, 4-1
 Final: lost to Antonio Roldan (Mexico) by disqualification (was awarded silver medal)

Pro career
Robinson turned pro in 1969 and won his first six bouts before being KO'd by journeyman Fermin Soto.  He recovered after the loss to win his next six bouts.

Death
On April 30, 1971, Robinson lapsed into a coma, after complaining that he was feeling ill after a workout at the New Oakland Boxing Club.  Robinson never came out of the coma, and died on January 24, 1974.

References

 "Robinson Remains in Semi Coma", May 10, 1971, Oakland Tribune
 "Oakland Boxer Dies", January 26, 1974, San Mateo Times

External links
 
 

1947 births
1974 deaths
Sportspeople from Oakland, California
Boxers from California
Featherweight boxers
Olympic boxers of the United States
Boxers at the 1968 Summer Olympics
Olympic silver medalists for the United States in boxing
American male boxers
People with disorders of consciousness
Medalists at the 1968 Summer Olympics
Pan American Games medalists in boxing
Pan American Games bronze medalists for the United States
Boxers at the 1967 Pan American Games
Medalists at the 1967 Pan American Games